Momoi (written: 桃井 lit. "peach well") is a Japanese surname. Notable people with the surname include:

 (born 1977), Japanese voice actress and singer-songwriter
 (born 1951), Japanese actress
 (1978–2002), Japanese AV idol

Japanese-language surnames